A concept album is an album whose tracks hold a larger purpose or meaning collectively than they do individually. This is typically achieved through a single central narrative or theme, which can be instrumental, compositional, or lyrical. Sometimes the term is applied to albums considered to be of "uniform excellence" rather than an LP with an explicit musical or lyrical motif. There is no consensus among music critics as to the specific criteria for what a "concept album" is.

The format originates with folk singer Woody Guthrie's Dust Bowl Ballads (1940) and was subsequently popularized by traditional pop/jazz singer Frank Sinatra's 1940s–50s string of albums, although the term is more often associated with rock music. In the 1960s several well-regarded concept albums were released by various rock bands, which eventually led to the invention of progressive rock and rock opera. Since then, many concept albums have been released across numerous musical genres.

Definitions
There is no clear definition of what constitutes a "concept album". Fiona Sturges of The Independent stated that the concept album "was originally defined as a long-player where the songs were based on one dramatic idea – but the term is subjective." A precursor to this type of album can be found in the 19th-century song cycle which ran into similar difficulties in classification. The extremely broad definitions of a "concept album" could potentially encompass all soundtracks, compilations, cast recordings, greatest hits albums, tribute albums, Christmas albums, and live albums.

The most common definitions refer to an expanded approach to a rock album (as a story, play, or opus), or a project that either revolves around a specific theme or a collection of related materials. AllMusic writes, "A concept album could be a collection of songs by an individual songwriter or a particular theme – these are the concept LPs that reigned in the '50s ... the phrase 'concept album' is inextricably tied to the late 1960s, when rock & rollers began stretching the limits of their art form." Author Jim Cullen describes it as "a collection of discrete but thematically unified songs whose whole is greater than the sum of its parts ... sometimes [erroneously] assumed to be a product of the rock era." Author Roy Shuker defines concept albums and rock operas as albums that are "unified by a theme, which can be instrumental, compositional, narrative, or lyrical. ...  In this form, the album changed from a collection of heterogeneous songs into a narrative work with a single theme, in which individual songs segue into one another."

Speaking of concepts in albums during the 1970s, Robert Christgau wrote in Christgau's Record Guide: Rock Albums of the Seventies (1981), because "overall impression" of an album matters, "concept intensifies the impact" of certain albums "in more or less the way Sgt. Pepper intended", as well as "a species of concept that pushes a rhythmically unrelenting album like The Wild Magnolias or a vocally irresistible one like Shirley Brown's Woman to Woman, to a deeper level of significance."

History

1940s–50s: Origins

In the 2016 documentary When Pop Went Epic: The Crazy World of the Concept Album, narrated by Rick Wakeman, it is suggested that the first concept album is Woody Guthrie's 1940 album Dust Bowl Ballads. The Independent regards it as "perhaps" one of the first concept albums, consisting exclusively of semi-autobiographical songs about the hardships of American migrant labourers during the 1930s. In the late 1940s, the LP record was introduced, with space age pop composers producing concept albums soon after. Themes included exploring wild life and dealing with emotions, with some albums meant to be played while dining or relaxing. This was accompanied in the mid 1950s with the invention of the gatefold, which allowed room for liner notes to explain the concept.

Singer Frank Sinatra recorded several concept albums prior to the 1960s rock era, including In the Wee Small Hours (1955), and Frank Sinatra Sings for Only the Lonely (1958). Sinatra is occasionally credited as the inventor of the concept album, beginning with The Voice of Frank Sinatra (1946), which led to similar work by Bing Crosby. According to biographer Will Friedwald, Sinatra "sequenced the songs so that the lyrics created a flow from track to track, affording an impression of a narrative, as in musical comedy or opera. ... [He was the] first pop singer to bring a consciously artistic attitude to recording."

Singer/pianist Nat "King" Cole (who, along with Sinatra, often collaborated with arranger Nelson Riddle during this era) was also an early pioneer of concept albums, as with his Wild Is Love (1960), a suite of original songs about a man's search for love.

1960s: Rock and country music

In the early 1960s, concept albums began featuring highly in American country music, however the fact went largely unacknowledged by rock/pop fans and critics who would only begin noting "concept albums" as a phenomenon later in the decade, when albums became closely aligned with countercultural ideology, resulting in a recognised "album era" and the introduction of the rock concept album. The author Carys Wyn Jones writes that the Beach Boys' Pet Sounds (1966), the Beatles' Revolver (1966) and Sgt. Pepper's Lonely Hearts Club Band (1967), and the Who's Tommy (1969) are variously cited as "the first concept album", usually for their "uniform excellence rather than some lyrical theme or underlying musical motif".

Other records have been claimed as "early" or "first" concept albums. The Beach Boys' first six albums, released over 1962–64, featured collections of songs unified respectively by a central concept, such as cars, surfing, and teenage lifestyles.  Writing in 101 Albums That Changed Popular Music, Chris Smith commented: "Though albums such as Frank Sinatra's 1955 In the Wee Small Hours and Marty Robbins' 1959 Gunfighter Ballads and Trail Songs had already introduced concept albums, [the Beach Boys' 1963 album] Little Deuce Coupe was the first to comprise almost all original material rather than standard covers." Music historian Larry Starr, who identifies the Beach Boys' 1964 releases Shut Down Volume 2 and All Summer Long as heralding the album era, cites Pet Sounds as the first rock concept album on the basis that it had been "conceived as an integrated whole, with interrelated songs arranged in a deliberate sequence."

The 100 Greatest Bands of All Time (2015) states that the Ventures "pioneered the idea of the rock concept album years before the genre is generally acknowledged to have been born". Writing in his Concise Dictionary of Popular Culture, Marcel Danesi identifies the Beatles' Rubber Soul (1965) and the Who's The Who Sell Out (1967) as other examples of early concept albums. Brian Boyd of The Irish Times names the Kinks' Face to Face (1966) as the first concept album: "Written entirely by Ray Davies, the songs were supposed to be linked by pieces of music, so that the album would play without gaps, but the record company baulked at such radicalism. It’s not one of the band’s finest works, but it did have an impact."

"Popular consensus" for the first rock concept album, according to AllMusic, favours Sgt. Pepper. According to music critic Tim Riley, "Strictly speaking, the Mothers of Invention's Freak Out! [1966] has claims as the first 'concept album', but Sgt. Pepper was the record that made that idea convincing to most ears." Musicologist Allan Moore says that "Even though previous albums had set a unified mood (notably Sinatra's Songs for Swinging Lovers), it was on the basis of the influence of Sgt. Pepper that the penchant for the concept album was born." Adding to Sgt. Peppers claim, the artwork reinforced its central theme by depicting the four Beatles in uniform as members of the Sgt. Pepper band, while the record omitted the gaps that usually separated album tracks. Music critic and journalist Neil Slaven stated that Frank Zappa's Absolutely Free, released the same day as Sgt. Pepper, was "very much a concept album, but The Beatles effortlessly stole his thunder", and subsequently Sgt. Pepper was hailed as "perhaps the first 'concept album' even though the songs were unrelated."

1960s–70s: Rock operas and progressive rock

Author Bill Martin relates the assumed concept albums of the 1960s to progressive rock:

Popmatters Sarah Zupko notes that while the Who's Tommy is "popularly thought of as the first rock opera, an extra-long concept album with characters, a consistent storyline, and a slight bit of pomposity", it is preceded by the shorter concept albums Ogdens' Nut Gone Flake (Small Faces, 1968) and S.F. Sorrow (The Pretty Things, 1968). Author Jim Cullen states: "The concept album reached its apogee in the 1970s in ambitious records like Pink Floyd's Dark Side of the Moon (1973) and the Eagles' Hotel California (1976)." In 2015, Rolling Stone ranked Dark Side of the Moon at number one among the 50 greatest progressive rock albums of all-time, also noting the LP's stature as the second best-selling album of all time. Pink Floyd's The Wall (1979), a semi-autobiographical story modeled after the band's Roger Waters and Syd Barrett, is one of the most famous concept albums by any artist. In addition to The Wall, Danesi highlights Genesis' The Lamb Lies Down on Broadway (1974) and Frank Zappa's Joe's Garage (1979) as other culturally significant concept albums.

According to author Edward Macan, concept albums as a recurrent theme in progressive rock was directly inspired by the counterculture associated with "the proto-progressive bands of the 1960s", observing: "the consistent use of lengthy forms such as the programmatic song cycle of the concept album and the multimovement suite underscores the hippies' new, drug-induced conception of time." Progressive soul musicians inspired by this approach conceived concept albums during this era reflecting themes and concerns of the African-American experience, including Marvin Gaye (1971's What's Going On) and George Clinton (the 1975 Parliament album Mothership Connection).

1980s–present: Decline and return to popularity
With the emergence of MTV as a music video network which valued singles over albums, concept albums became less dominant in the 1980s. Some artists, however, still released concept albums and experienced success in the 1990s and 2000s. NMEs Emily Barker cites Green Day's American Idiot (2004) as one of the "more notable" examples, having brought the concept album back to high-charting positions. My Chemical Romance’s The Black Parade (2006) is another example of a modern concept album. Dorian Lynskey, writing for GQ, noted a resurgence of concept albums in the 2010s due to streaming: "This is happening not in spite of the rise of streaming and playlists, but because of it. Threatened with redundancy in the digital era, albums have fought back by becoming more album-like." Cucchiara argues that "concept albums" should also describe "this new generation of concept albums, for one key reason. This is because the unison between the songs on a particular album has now been expanded into a broader field of visual and artistic design and marketing strategies that play into the themes and stories that form the album."

In the 21st century, the field of classical music has adopted the idea of the "concept album", citing such historical examples as Schubert's Winterreise and Schumann's Liederkreis as prototypes for contemporary composers and musicians. Classical composers and performers increasingly adopt production and marketing strategies that unify otherwise disparate works into concept albums or concerts. The classical music magazine Gramophone includes a special category for "concept album" in its annual "Recordings of the Year Awards", to celebrate "albums where a creative mind has curated something visionary, a programme whose whole speaks more powerfully than its parts. A thought-through journey, which compels to be heard in one sitting."

In a year-ending essay on the album in 2019, Ann Powers wrote for Slate that the year found the medium in a state of flux. In her observation, many recording artists revitalized the concept album around autobiographical narratives and personal themes, such as intimacy, intersectionality, African-American life, boundaries among women, and grief associated with death. She cited such albums as Brittany Howard's Jaime, Raphael Saadiq's Jimmy Lee, Jamila Woods' Legacy! Legacy!, Rapsody's Eve, Jenny Lewis' On the Line, Julia Jacklin's Crushing, Joe Henry's The Gospel According to Water, and Nick Cave's Ghosteen.

See also
 Album era
 List of concept albums

Notes

References

Bibliography

Further reading
 
 

 
Album types